Mimí Nasthas Butto de Panayotti (born 1938) is a Honduran writer, journalist, and theologian.

Biography
Mimí Panayotti was born in La Lima in 1938. Her parents were immigrants who settled there to work for the Tela Railroad Company. She attended the Esteban Guardiola School in La Lima for primary studies. Some time later she moved to Tegucigalpa to continue her secondary studies. Years later, she and her family moved to La Ceiba, where she met Juan Panayotti, whom she married. She lived with her husband in La Ceiba, where she collected from debtors for her husband's company (now known as Panavisión Industries). She moved to San Pedro Sula when her husband and brother-in-law set up a sign factory in that city. In 1980, she joined the Mother Teresa Charity Mission and obtained a degree in theology. In 1985, she graduated with a licentiate in communication sciences from the University of San Pedro Sula. She has been a columnist for La Prensa since 1983.

A Catholic, Panayotti is known for holding elaborate Christmas celebrations and exhibiting a collection of over 200 nativity scenes.

Works
 Con el gozo de servirte (2005)
 ¿Cómo será usted recordado? (2012)
 Billetes bancarios de Honduras 1850–1950 (2014)
 Un poco de mí (2018)
 Confieso que lo disfruté (2018)

References

1938 births
20th-century Honduran women writers
20th-century Honduran writers
21st-century Honduran women writers
21st-century Honduran writers
Honduran journalists
Honduran women journalists
Living people
People from Cortés Department
Honduran columnists
Honduran women columnists